Pyridinium p-toluenesulfonate (PPTS) is a colourless solid salt of pyridine and p-toluenesulfonic acid.

Uses 
In organic synthesis, PPTS is used as a weakly acidic catalyst, providing an organic soluble source of pyridinium (C5H5NH+) ions. For example, PPTS is used to deprotect silyl ethers or tetrahydropyranyl ethers when a substrate is unstable to stronger acid catalysts.  It is also a commonly used catalyst for the preparation of acetals and ketals from aldehydes and ketones.

References 

Sulfonates
Pyridinium compounds
Salts
Reagents for organic chemistry
P-Tosyl compounds